De Loonse en Drunense Duinen National Park (duinen = dunes) is a national park situated in the south of the Netherlands, between the cities of Tilburg, Waalwijk and 's-Hertogenbosch. It has been designated as a national park since 2002. It is 35 km² (14 mile²) in area, and located in the municipalities of Loon op Zand, Heusden, and Vught.

The Loonse en Drunense Duinen consists of forests and very large dunes, creating an extraordinary microclimate.

References

External links
 Official website

Protected areas established in 2002
2002 establishments in the Netherlands
Dunes of the Netherlands
Forests of the Netherlands
National parks of the Netherlands
Parks in North Brabant
Heusden
Loon op Zand
Vught